Same Kind of Different  is the debut extended play (EP) by Australian indie pop artist Dean Lewis. It was released on 12 May 2017.

In an interview with Stack Magazine, Lewis said "I go through phases when I'm writing songs; if I'm surging to that kind of music, I'm just keen to write songs like that. I think that there's a thread through them. But I've written 100 to 150 [songs] in the last two years so it was really tough choosing songs for the EP. And it's also hard because I don't want to give everything away too quickly. I kept the ones that I think will be better for the album. I'm really proud of the songs so I can't wait to put this EP out there."

The EP was supported with a "Lose My Mind" national tour throughout November and December 2017. The tour was announced in August 2017.

Reception

Tim Kroenert of The Music said "Dean Lewis presents six largely acoustic-driven pop tracks that seem tailored for broad appeal. There are few surprises, just frank, personal lyrics delivered with emotional heft, like a less angsty James Blunt." adding "Lewis' skills as a pop melodist come to the fore on infectious single "Waves" and the vaguely menacing torch song "Lose My Mind"."

Track listing

Notes
  signifies an additional producer

Charts

Certifications

Release history

References

2017 debut EPs
Dean Lewis albums
Island Records EPs